Philip Hart Cullom (born July 17, 1957) is a retired vice admiral in the United States Navy.

Biography
Cullom is a native of Flossmoor, Illinois. He earned an MBA from Harvard Business School in 1988.

Career
Cullom graduated from the United States Naval Academy in 1979. Ashore, Cullom's assignments include serving with the Office of Management and Budget, the Chief of Naval Operations, the Joint Chiefs of Staff, the United States National Security Council and the Idaho National Laboratory.

Awards he has received include the Navy Distinguished Service Medal, the Defense Superior Service Medal, the Legion of Merit, the Superior Honor Award and the French National Order of Merit (Officer).

In November 2015, President Barack Obama nominated Cullom to serve as Assistant Secretary of Defense for Energy, Installations, and Environment. This nomination was withdrawn in January 2016. Cullom retired from active duty in 2017.

References

People from Flossmoor, Illinois
Military personnel from Illinois
United States Navy vice admirals
Recipients of the Navy Distinguished Service Medal
Recipients of the Defense Superior Service Medal
Recipients of the Legion of Merit
Officers of the Ordre national du Mérite
United States Naval Academy alumni
Harvard Business School alumni
Living people
1957 births